Matthew David Woolley (born 22 February 1982) is an English former professional footballer who played as a midfielder in the Football League for Macclesfield Town. He was associated with Manchester City as a schoolboy, and began a youth traineeship with Stockport County before joining Macclesfield, and also played non-league football for clubs including Congleton Town.

References

1982 births
Living people
Footballers from Manchester
English footballers
Association football midfielders
Manchester City F.C. players
Stockport County F.C. players
Macclesfield Town F.C. players
Congleton Town F.C. players
English Football League players